Rajar Raja is a 1994 Indian Bengali film directed by Shamit Bhanja. The film stars Prosenjit, Debashree Roy, Abhishek Chatterjee and Rupa Ganguly in the lead roles.

Cast
Prosenjit 
Debashree Roy
Abhishek Chatterjee 
Roopa Ganguly
Haradhan Bandopadhyay
Koushik Bandyopadhyay 
Debnath Chattopadhyay 
Rahul Barman

References

External links
 

1994 films
Bengali-language Indian films
1990s Bengali-language films